Punugulu or Punukkulu is a snack and common street food in Vijayawada and a few coastal districts of Andhra Pradesh. Punugulu is a deep fried snack made with rice, urad dal and other spices. They are often served with peanut chutney, known as palli chutney, coconut chutney, verusanaga chutney or toordal chutney known as Kandhi Pachadi, or they can be served with capsicum peanut chutney. They are also very popular in Hyderabad.

Preparation

Punugulu is prepared with rice batter which is used to make idly, dosa. The batter may be fresh or fermented. Accordingly, the taste differs. First oil is heated in a vessel for frying. A small amount of batter in added into the oil and deep fried. Punugulu is generally crispy outside and soft inside.

See also
Bonda
Indian cuisine
Mangalore bajji

References

Indian snack foods
Street food
South Indian cuisine